Werner Fuchs (25 October 1948 – 11 May 1999) was a German football player and coach.

Playing career 
Fuchs was born in Kaiserslautern. A centre forward, he began his professional career in 1967 with a professional contract at 1. FC Kaiserslautern, where is older brother Fritz also played professionally. Werner Fuchs only appeared once in the first team against Eintracht Braunschweig on 10 February 1968, and would remain his only appearance in the Bundesliga. Although he did feature in another Bundesliga team, Hannover 96 in 1972, he transferred to the regional league team SC Preußen Münster in that same season without making an appearance. He played on in Münster until his retirement in 1980.

Coaching career 
His greatest achievements came as a football manager. As trainer of Alemannia Aachen, he enjoyed huge popularity among the citizens of Aachen. He was trainer there from 1984 to 1987, and then again from 1996 until his death in 1999. He took Alemannia Aachen back into the 2. Bundesliga, but was unable to continue his success as a few days before the final league game, which Aachen won to secure promotion, he collapsed during a walk in the woods with the team and died of a heart attack aged 50. He continues to be honoured by Aachen fans today, with signs in the stadium, for example.

Tributes 
On the tenth anniversary of Werner Fuchs' death, Alemannia Aachen announced that the new amateur stadium belonging to the also New Tivoli stadium would be named the "Werner-Fuchs-Stadion", following suggestions from fans.

References

External links 
 Obituary 
 Chronicle of Alemannia's promotion to the 2. Bundesliga, dedicated to Werner Fuchs 
 

1948 births
1999 deaths
German footballers
People from Kaiserslautern
Association football forwards
Footballers from Rhineland-Palatinate
Bundesliga players
2. Bundesliga players
1. FC Kaiserslautern players
SV Alsenborn players
Hannover 96 players
SC Preußen Münster players
German football managers
Bundesliga managers
2. Bundesliga managers
Alemannia Aachen managers
1. FC Saarbrücken managers
Hertha BSC managers
Eintracht Braunschweig managers
VfB Oldenburg managers
Wuppertaler SV managers
West German footballers
West German football managers